SNC may refer to:

Politics 
 Solidarity National Committee of the American Solidarity Party
 The Syrian National Council, an opposition coalition
 National Coalition for Syrian Revolutionary and Opposition Forces or Syrian National Coalition
 Sahrawi National Council of the Sahrawi Arab Democratic Republic

Companies and organizations 
 Satellite News Channel, former US cable channel
 Sierra Nevada Corporation, a US aerospace company
 Sierra Nevada College, a US university
 St. Norbert College, De Pere, Wisconsin, US
 SNC-Lavalin, a Canadian engineering firm
 Air Cargo Carriers ICAO code
 Soda Nikka Co., Ltd. - Japanese chemical company

Science and technology 
 SNC Meteorites
 SNC, collective term for the three scientific journals Science, Nature and Cell
 Secure Network Communications, an SAP protocol
 Selective Nef complex in mathematics
 SAP Supply Network Collaboration, SAP business software
 Substantia nigra pars compacta, or SNc, a region of the brain

Transport 
 Air Cargo Carriers ICAO code
 General Ulpiano Paez Airport, IATA code
 Chester Airport, FAA code
 Curtiss-Wright CW-22 aircraft, US Navy name

Other uses 
 Società in nome collettivo (S.n.c.), a general partnership in Italian corporate law
 , a legal partnership in France
 Single national curriculum, Pakistan
 Sinaugoro language of Papua New Guinea, ISO 639-3 code
 National Culture Week of Burkina Faso (Semaine Nationale de la Culture)